The iRiver E100 is a portable media player developed by iRiver. It features a 2.4" TFT LCD 320x240 colour screen, built-in 1 watt speakers, a line in port and a microSD card expansion slot up to 8GB. The user interface is navigated by using the iRiver "D*Click" scheme. However, the controls are isolated to the lower section of the device's front. There are minimal buttons located on the side of the device including a power button and two-in-one volume bar. There is also a "hold" switch located on the other side of the device.

The iRiver E100 is capable of playing music files in various formats including FLAC, Ogg, APE, DRM and non-DRM WMA files, MP3 with image and 2-lines karaoke. Video files in MPEG, AVI (MPEG-4 codec support), MP4, WMV and FLV (can play YouTube FLV directly, without conversion). Photos in JPEG (non-progressive), BMP, GIF, PNG formats. Texts in TXT format (supports a lot of foreign languages including all European languages, Russian, Chinese, Japanese, Hebrew, Indian, Korean etc.). Has an in-built podcast-ready Voice Audio Recorder with internal microphone (it is also possible  to attach external professional stereo microphones) and FM Radio (with Radio Recorder) which is customisable in E100 devices running E100 firmware 1.03 or higher through the iriver plus 3 software. All recordings are directly encoded to WMA format.

First released in Europe on leap day, the iriver E100 was priced at €79.99, €99.99 and €129.99 for 2 GB, 4 GB and 8 GB variants respectively and came in five colours; White, Black, Chocolate Brown, Sky Blue and Pink.

Firmware and software
The iRiver E100's firmware is upgradeable using a special Windows application which is bundled with the iriver E100. The device was released in Europe with Firmware version 1.02 preloaded. The firmware updater, which can be downloaded from the iRiver support site, does not run on 64-bit versions of Windows. However the firmware updater on the original software CD does.

Software for E100 Karaoke
The iRiver Caption Editor allows to edit or to create new lyrics files (.snc) for MP3. It is a program for creating SNC lyrics files (manually synchronized with MP3 songs). Adding SNC to MP3 with iRiver Caption Editor doesn't work for E100. The program can only be used for manual synchronization of the song text with mp3, and creating new SNC files. 

The iRiver LDB Manager allows to find files with lyrics automatically from the internet database, and then add karaoke text into MP3. This software also allows to add lyrics from SNC file into MP3 file (previously created with iRiver Caption Editor) that is viewable on E100.

References

Digital audio players
Portable media players